The Mount Macedon Memorial Cross is a heritage-listed war memorial at 405 Cameron Drive, Mount Macedon, Macedon Ranges Shire, Victoria, Australia. It is also known as the Cameron Memorial Cross. It was listed on the Victorian Heritage Register on 1 September 1994.

History 
The Mount Macedon Memorial Cross was planned and constructed for local land owner William Cameron. In addition to desiring to honour the war dead of World War I, Cameron wanted to create employment during the Great Depression. On Saturday 16 March 1935, the Victorian Premier, Stanley Argyle, officially dedicated the memorial to the Australian service people killed in the First World War. Over 400 people attended the ceremony despite the bitter wind and rain. The monument cost  which was paid by William Cameron except for  contributed by Gisborne Shire Council.

Although it withstood lightning strikes and bushfires over the years, eventually the cross's internal steel structure weakened and was assessed as being at risk of falling down. After a number of years of planning, in 1995 the monument was replaced with a visually identical replica but was constructed with solid reinforced concrete which is expected to be longer lasting.

Description 
The cross is in a reserve near the summit of Mount Macedon and is reached by a  access road. It is constructed of pale yellow Wunderlich terracotta tiles on a steel base. It can be seen from a great distance from the plains below the mountain.

A tablet on the monument has the words: "To the glory of God and in memory of Australia's sons, 1914-1918. Death cannot rob them of their glory nor time efface the memory of their gallant deeds."

Significance 

The Mount Macedon (Cameron) Memorial Cross is important for spiritual, symbolic cultural and social reasons. The Cross is important as a memorial for those who lost their lives in the First World War and became for many a symbol of courage and survival after the 1983 Ash Wednesday bushfires. The war dead are commemorated at a dawn service held at the base of the cross on Anzac Day each year. The size, simplicity of the design of the Cameron Memorial Cross, along with its siting on Mount Macedon, is a rare example of a memorial commemorating those who died in the First World War. It is able to demonstrate an association with an important event in Victoria's history, the First World War, and it demonstrates the use of particular material in the form of Wunderlich tiles which, because of their reflective nature, are able to enhance the simplicity and symbolism of the Cross, and enable it to be viewed from considerable distances.

It is considered Victoria's most significant war memorial after the Shrine of Remembrance in Melbourne.

References

Attribution 
This article contains material from Cameron Memorial Cross, Cameron Dr, Mount Macedon, VIC, Australia published in the Australian Heritage Database by the Australian Government under CC-BY-4.0 license accessed 14 August 2018.

Further reading

External links

Victorian Heritage Register
World War I memorials in Australia
Mount Macedon, Victoria